Carbrooke Preceptory was a medieval monastic house of Knights Templar and Knights Hospitaller in Norfolk, England.

References

Monasteries in Norfolk